Howard Leigh (born June 1940) is an Australian radio personality, sports journalist, and veteran boxing announcer from Melbourne, Australia.

Boxing announcer
Leigh is a sports journalist, boxing and kick-boxing analyst and ring announcer, who has been on the sports scene in Melbourne for some 40 years.

Renowned for his flamboyant colourful dinner suits in all shades of lemon, lime, gold and black whilst performing his role as ring announcer at various boxing and kick-boxing promotions around Australia, he is now considered a leading ring announcer in Australia since the death of the Ray Connolly several years ago.

Journalism
Leigh has had a long association with the Sunday Herald Sun newspaper in Melbourne, and is the current District and State cricket reporter, as well as being the Australian rules football reporter during the winter months.

Radio career
Leigh was brought into the SEN 1116 radio fold in 2004 by his lawyer, Stephen J. Peak, and Tony Schibeci. Leigh has since become a key member of Gladiators of Sport and is titled, "Hollywood Maximus".

He also appears with Stephen J. Peak at Sport 927 on the Andrew Kuuse night time show "Sportstalk".

2006
Leigh appeared as an announcer during the 2006 Commonwealth Games boxing events, although he was not allowed to perform his customary "in-the-ring" announcing role – instead calling from the commentary box.

References

Living people
1951 births
Australian sports broadcasters
Radio personalities from Melbourne
Journalists from Melbourne